In mathematics, a complex differential form is a differential form on a manifold (usually a complex manifold) which is permitted to have complex coefficients.

Complex forms have broad applications in differential geometry.  On complex manifolds, they are fundamental and serve as the basis for much of algebraic geometry, Kähler geometry, and Hodge theory.  Over non-complex manifolds, they also play a role in the study of almost complex structures, the theory of spinors, and CR structures.

Typically, complex forms are considered because of some desirable decomposition that the forms admit.  On a complex manifold, for instance, any complex k-form can be decomposed uniquely into a sum of so-called (p, q)-forms: roughly, wedges of p differentials of the holomorphic coordinates with q differentials of their complex conjugates.  The ensemble of (p, q)-forms becomes the primitive object of study, and determines a finer geometrical structure on the manifold than the k-forms.  Even finer structures exist, for example, in cases where Hodge theory applies.

Differential forms on a complex manifold 
Suppose that M is a complex manifold of complex dimension n.  Then there is a local coordinate system consisting of n complex-valued functions z1, ..., zn such that the coordinate transitions from one patch to another are holomorphic functions of these variables.  The space of complex forms carries a rich structure, depending fundamentally on the fact that these transition functions are holomorphic, rather than just smooth.

One-forms 
We begin with the case of one-forms.  First decompose the complex coordinates into their real and imaginary parts:  for each j.  Letting

one sees that any differential form with complex coefficients can be written uniquely as a sum

Let Ω1,0 be the space of complex differential forms containing only 's and Ω0,1 be the space of forms containing only 's.  One can show, by the Cauchy–Riemann equations, that the spaces Ω1,0 and Ω0,1 are stable under holomorphic coordinate changes.  In other words, if one makes a different choice wi of holomorphic coordinate system, then elements of Ω1,0 transform tensorially, as do elements of Ω0,1.  Thus the spaces Ω0,1 and Ω1,0 determine complex vector bundles on the complex manifold.

Higher-degree forms 
The wedge product of complex differential forms is defined in the same way as with real forms.  Let p and q be a pair of non-negative integers ≤ n.   The space Ωp,q of (p, q)-forms is defined by taking linear combinations of the wedge products of p elements from Ω1,0 and q elements from Ω0,1.  Symbolically,

where there are p factors of Ω1,0 and q factors of Ω0,1.  Just as with the two spaces of 1-forms, these are stable under holomorphic changes of coordinates, and so determine vector bundles.

More succinctly, there is a direct sum decomposition

Because this direct sum decomposition is stable under holomorphic coordinate changes, it also determines a vector bundle decomposition.

The Dolbeault operators 
The usual exterior derivative defines a mapping of sections  via

The exterior derivative does not in itself reflect the more rigid complex structure of the manifold.

Using d and the projections defined in the previous subsection, it is possible to define the Dolbeault operators:

To describe these operators in local coordinates, let

where I and J are multi-indices.  Then

The following properties are seen to hold:

These operators and their properties form the basis for Dolbeault cohomology and many aspects of Hodge theory.

This is a content of the Poincare lemma on a complex manifold.

On compact Kähler manifolds a global form of the local -lemma holds, known as the -lemma. It is a consequence of Hodge theory, and states that a complex differential form which is globally -exact (in other words, whose class in de Rham cohomology is zero) is globally -exact.

Holomorphic forms
For each p, a holomorphic p-form is a holomorphic section of the bundle Ωp,0.  In local coordinates, then, a holomorphic p-form can be written in the form

Equivalently, and due to the independence of the complex conjugate, the (p, 0)-form α is holomorphic if and only if

The sheaf of holomorphic p-forms is often written Ωp, although this can sometimes lead to confusion so many authors tend to adopt an alternative notation.

See also 

Dolbeault complex
Frölicher spectral sequence
Differential of the first kind

References 

 
 
 

Complex manifolds
Differential forms